Justin James Newell (born 8 February 1980) is an English former professional footballer who played as a forward in the Football League for Torquay United.

Newwell joined Torquay as a trainee and made his debut on 27 September 1997 as a second-half substitute, for Tony Bedeau, as Torquay won 2–1 at home to Doncaster Rovers. He was released at the end of the season and joined the Army, playing football whenever possible.

In 2000, he was playing for Newton Abbot Spurs and was still with them in March 2002.

References

External links

Living people
1980 births
English footballers
Association football forwards
English Football League players
Torquay United F.C. players
German expatriate footballers
German expatriate sportspeople in England
Expatriate footballers in England